Joël Chenal (born 10 October 1973 in Moûtiers) is a French alpine skier.

Chenal won a silver medal in the giant slalom at the 2006 Winter Olympics in Turin. His other notable successes are first place in Alta Badia (19 December 1999), second place in Yongpyong (26 February 2000) and third place in Kranjska Gora (8 March 2000), all of them in giant slalom.

World cup victories

References 

1973 births
Living people
French male alpine skiers
Olympic alpine skiers of France
Alpine skiers at the 1998 Winter Olympics
Alpine skiers at the 2002 Winter Olympics
Alpine skiers at the 2006 Winter Olympics
Olympic silver medalists for France
Olympic medalists in alpine skiing
Medalists at the 2006 Winter Olympics